Johnny Deakin was a Scottish footballer, who played for St Mirren, Clyde, Linfield and Scotland.

References

External links

London Hearts profile

Year of birth missing
Year of death missing
Scottish footballers
Scotland international footballers
Association football inside forwards
St Mirren F.C. players
Clyde F.C. players
Linfield F.C. players
Johnstone Burgh F.C. players
Scottish Football League players
Scottish Football League representative players
Brentford F.C. wartime guest players
Glentoran F.C. players
Bangor F.C. players
Place of birth missing
Place of death missing